H.A.S. Hanandjoeddin International Airport or formerly known as Buluh Tumbang Airport  is an airport in Tanjung Pandan, Bangka-Belitung, Indonesia. It is the main and only airport serving Belitung Island. H.A.S. Hanandjoeddin Airport is named after an Indonesian Air Force pioneer and former regent of the Belitung Regency, H.A.S Hanandjoeddin (1910–1995).

Airlines and destinations

Statistics

Accidents and incidents

On 19 April 1997, a British Aerospace ATP aircraft owned by Merpati Airlines, flight number 106, crashed while approaching the airport . The aircraft reportedly went into a steep left bank as it descended through . The crew lost control of the plane, and it crashed breaking into three pieces. Twelve passengers and three crew members died in the accident.

References

External links
 

Airports in Sumatra
Buildings and structures in the Bangka Belitung Islands